Tigers Jaw is an American rock band from Scranton, Pennsylvania, formed in 2005. Their first album, Belongs to the Dead, was released in 2006. They released a 7-inch single, "Spirit Desire", in 2009, on Tiny Engines. They released two more albums before announcing a hiatus in March 2013; however, their record label Run for Cover Records announced in August 2013 that the band's breakup was not official. Their fourth album, Charmer, came out in June 2014, and their fifth, Spin, in 2017.

History

Early years and Tigers Jaw (2006–2012)
The band's name is a reference to a song by lo-fi band The Microphones. They also have a number of songs whose titles reference songs by the band. Members Ben Walsh and Adam McIlwee started the group during high school, with Brianna Collins joining after the first couple of months. They have cited Fall Out Boy and My Chemical Romance as early musical influences.

AbsolutePunk gave their self-titled album a generally positive review, noting that "Tigers Jaw is fueled by emotionally-driven lyrics brought to life by vocalist Adam McIlwee, whose voice is one of those that reveal passion while at the same time giving the impression that he's barely trying. Aforementioned opener "The Sun" is one of the better tracks on the album, offering up a well-organized mix of Tigers Jaw's two personas."

Another punk music website, Punknews.org, in their critique of the band's eponymous album, felt that the tracks "Plane vs. Tank vs. Submarine" and "Chemicals" were particularly notable for "solid guitar work in the form of weeping, goosebump-inducing solos. Strong vocal harmonies and bouncy guitar work carry both 'I Saw Water' and 'Heat' to heights other bands would have a hard time reaching." In November 2012, the group supported Title Fight on their headlining US tour.

Charmer (2013–2016)
On March 21, 2013, Tigers Jaw made an announcement on their Tumblr: 

Many fans interpreted this announcement to mean that the band was breaking up. However, both Walsh and Collins clarified that they would continue with Tigers Jaw as a two-piece. Members of Basement filled in during their 2013 UK tour, while members of Balance and Composure filled in for the US dates. After the announcement, Brianna did an interview, where she said that "I know Ben and I really want to work on a new record, put something out. It’ll happen."

After leaving Tigers Jaw, Adam McIlwee pursued his experimental solo project Wicca Phase Springs Eternal. Under this name, McIlwee blended emo and goth esthetics with cloud rap and trap, became a key member in musical groups such as THRAXXHOUSE and GothBoiClique, and famously collaborated with the late Lil Peep. 

Tigers Jaw announced their next studio album, Charmer, on March 21, 2014, along with the single "Nervous Kids". Charmer reached No. 49 on the Billboard Charts. They played a U.S. tour with Touché Amoré and Dads in mid-2014.

They went on a U.S. tour with Lemuria and Somos in early 2015. In May 2015, it was announced that Tigers Jaw would be touring the U.S. with New Found Glory and Yellowcard in late 2015. In June 2015, the band played in Brazil and performed three acoustic shows in New York, Philadelphia, and Somerville. Tigers Jaw toured Australia in July 2015. In August 2015, they toured in the UK/Europe with Foxing. The band then performed various acoustic shows before undertaking another UK/Europe tour with Basement in February and March 2016.

spin, Eyes Shut, and I Won't Care How You Remember Me (2017–present)
On March 22, 2017, spin was announced for release on May 19 through Black Cement Records, with a U.S. tour starting the same day. The album saw the release of three singles: "Guardian," "June" and "Window." In 2018, the band also performed several shows commemorating the ten-year anniversary of the band's self-titled album.

In 2019, the band released a new stand-alone single, "Eyes Shut." The track was recorded in the sessions for spin, but did not make the final cut. The single served as the title track of a new EP, which paired it with acoustic versions of "Guardian," "Follows" and "Eyes Shut." 2019 also saw the addition of touring musicians Teddy Roberts and Colin Gorman as full-time members of Tigers Jaw.

In 2020, the band released a new song entitled "Warn Me." It marked the band's first release as part of the Hopeless Records roster. Although "Warn Me" would not appear on the band's then-untitled sixth studio album, the band confirmed they had been in the studio with Will Yip working on it.

In October 2020, the band released a new single, "Cat's Cradle". It serves as the official lead single to the band's sixth album, I Won't Care How You Remember Me. Three other singles followed from 2020 to 2021: "Lemon Mouth", "Hesitation", and "New Detroit". The album was released on March 5, 2021, along with a record release show on YouTube.

Members

Current members
 Ben Walsh – lead and backing vocals, guitars (2007–present), drums, percussion (2005–2007, 2016–2019), bass (2016–2019)
 Brianna Collins – backing and lead vocals, keyboards (2006–present)
 Theodore "Teddy" Roberts – drums, backing vocals (2019–present; touring member 2014, 2015–2019)
 Colin Gorman – bass, guitar (2019–present; touring member 2013, 2018–2019)

Current touring musicians
 Mark Lebiecki – guitar (2019–present)
 Sam Acchione – guitar (2021–present)

Former members
 Adam McIlwee – backing and lead vocals, guitars (2005–2013)
 Mike May – drums (2007)
 Dennis Mishko – bass (2007–2013)
 Pat Brier – drums (2007–2013)

Former touring musicians
 Andrew Fisher – bass (2013)
 James Fisher – drums (2013)
 Matt Warner – bass (2013)
 Bailey Van Ellis – drums (2013)
 Derrick Sherman – guitars, vocals (2013, 2015)
 Eliot Babin – drums (2014)
 Jake Woodruff – guitars (2014)
 Sam Lister – drums (2015)
 Pat Benson – guitars (2015–2018)
 Luke Schwartz – bass (2014–2018)

Timeline

Discography

Studio albums
 Belongs to the Dead (2006)
 Tigers Jaw (2008)
 Two Worlds (2010)
 Charmer (2014)
 Spin (2017)
 I Won't Care How You Remember Me (2021)

References

External links
 
 Tigers Jaw on Run for Cover Records

American emo musical groups
Emo revival groups
Indie rock musical groups from Pennsylvania
Pop punk groups from Pennsylvania
Musicians from Scranton, Pennsylvania
2005 establishments in Pennsylvania
Musical groups established in 2005
Run for Cover Records artists
Topshelf Records artists
No Sleep Records artists
Hopeless Records artists
Tiny Engines artists